Saikoro Fiction ("Dice Fiction"; abbreviated "SF") is a Japanese role-playing game universal system developed by  and presented by  (Bouken Kikaku-Kyoku).

Core mechanics 
Saikoro Fiction requires one or more six-sided dice to play. The character sheets for each game have a "Skill table" for judgment rolls. The skill table is composed of rows of skills numbered 2–12, arranged under six associated attributes. This allows for a total of 66 skills, which differ for each game that uses the system. For example, the coordinates of "Death" is 6-12 in "Magicalogia", but 6-5 in "inSANe". The adjoining cell is mostly a relationship skill (word). Narrow gaps are left between the attribute columns.

A fictitious table is given below for the purpose of explanation:

When the player creates a playable character, they select the player character's "Strong Skills" (特技) according to the rules of the game. In some cases, the player can fill some gaps in the table. On the above table, the parts highlighted in black indicate the player character's strong skills, and gap D is filled.

When a character makes a judgment roll in this system, the Gamemaster designates an "Assignment skill" (指定特技) which determines a target number for success. Players use two six-sided dice (2d6) and must roll a sum equal to or higher than the target number to succeed in the judgment role. When the assignment skill is one of the player character's strong skills, the target number is 5; otherwise the target number is 5 plus the number of cells on the table (including unfilled gap cells) between the assignment skill and the closest strong skill. Incidentally, the skills table may usually not have joined attribute 6 to attribute 1, and cell 12 to cell 2. For example, on the above table, the target number of "Domination" is 7, "Recovery" is 8, and "Paralysis Tolerance" is 7. The skill table's coordinates may be used to randomize an Assignment skill.

Saikoro Fiction's game sessions proceed under the "scene system" (ja) (cf. Standard RPG System#Scene system).

Games that use Saikoro Fiction 
Neighborhood Märchen TRPG: Peek a boo (ja)
Shinobigami (ja) (English official page)
Hunters Moon (ja)
Grimoire Great War TRPG:Magicalogia (ja)
Blood Crusade (ja)
Card Ranker (ja)
Multi genre horror TRPG: inSANe (ja)
Reality Show RPG: Kill Death Business (ja)
Horror action TRPG: Blood moon - This rule integrated Hunters Moon with Blood Crusade.
KanColle RPG
Beginning Idol

References

External links 
 Official Website 
 cf. Sinobigami's rule
 d66roc.wordpress.com

Japanese role-playing games
Role-playing game systems